The Great Garrick is a 1937 American historical comedy film directed by James Whale and starring Brian Aherne, Olivia de Havilland, and Edward Everett Horton. The film also features Lionel Atwill, Luis Alberni, Melville Cooper, and future star Lana Turner, who has a bit part. Based on the play Ladies and Gentlemen by Ernest Vajda, the film is about the famous eighteenth-century British actor David Garrick, who travels to France for a guest appearance at the Comédie Française. When the French actors hear rumours that he said he will teach them the art of acting, they devise a plot to teach him a lesson. Though often overlooked by critics in favor of Whale's horror films, The Great Garrick was chosen by Jonathan Rosenbaum for his alternative list of the Top 100 American Films.

Plot
In London in 1750, renowned English actor David Garrick announces onstage that he has been invited to Paris to work with the prestigious Comédie-Française. A fop in a box seat declares that the French want Garrick to teach them how to act, and the audience chants, "Teach the French!" The playwright Beaumarchais attributes the remark to Garrick himself. The outraged French actors, led by their president, Picard, take over the inn where he will be staying, and Beaumarchais devises a plot to humiliate Garrick publicly.

On the road to Paris, Garrick meets Jean Cabot, an elderly admirer who once acted with him in Hamlet and now works as a Comédie-Française prompter. Cabot—who was tossed out of the Comedie-Française meeting when he protested that Garrick might be innocent—has ridden non-stop for two days to warn the actor, although he does not know the details of the plot. Cabot advises him to travel straight to Paris. Garrick decides to stop at the inn as planned and play along, despite the misgivings of his valet/companion Tubby  and Cabot's concern that there may be violence.

At the inn, Picard tries to rally his cast, but meets with temperament and histrionics on every side, particularly from Basset, whose insistence on playing a madman is quite maddening. They plan to discomfort the Englishman with a near miss from a falling trunk; a seemingly fatal duel with swords; a shootout between a husband and his wife's lover; Basset's mad waiter; and finally, an attack from a violent blacksmith.

Garrick and Tubby arrive at the inn, and the "blacksmith," drunk and lacking a script, mistakes his cue and smashes one of the carriage wheels. Garrick adroitly steps out of the way of the falling luggage and is unperturbed when the duelists cross swords over his dinner.

A complication arises in mid-performance when Germaine Dupont, Countess de la Corbe, appears at the inn. Her coach has broken down. Garrick believes she is one of the actresses, when she is actually fleeing a marriage arranged by her father. He plays along, offering her his room. Over the course of the evening, they fall in love.

After an entertaining evening, Garrick overhears the "blacksmith" reviewing his script and reminding himself to hit the anvil with his hammer and not Garrick's head. He disguises himself as the blacksmith and, pretending to be drunk, tells the aghast troupe that he has struck and killed their intended victim. Tubby rages at them and demands that someone call out the guard. The actors plan to flee. Then Garrick reveals his identity.

He does not betray Cabot. There is no need, as he easily reveals the flaws in their performances. Garrick adds that he admires the Comédie Française and never said anything so stupid as the remark that precipitated this farce.

In her room, he storms at Germaine for her bad acting, including her bad kissing. Infuriated, she responds that she does not have much experience, but does not correct his mistake. Garrick leaves her with the furious advice that she quit the stage.

Downstairs, Picard apologizes on behalf of the company and begs Garrick to join them in Paris. Garrick graciously accepts.

At his premiere in Paris, about to play Don Juan for the first time, Garrick searches the stage for Germaine. He learns from Picard that she is not a member of the company. Realizing that she was telling the truth and that he actually loves her, he declares that he is too distraught to perform ever again, unless he finds her. He goes out to announce this to the audience and sees Germaine in a box, beaming. He is struck dumb. In the prompt box, Jean Cabot holds up a black board that reads: "I met her at the stable. I explained. She knows, understands, forgives, loves." Inspired, Garrick launches into a speech about being in love. Germaine is at first delighted, then becomes worried when it seems he will reveal her name—however Garrick identifies his new love as la belle France. She tosses a flower to him.

Cast

 Brian Aherne as David Garrick
 Olivia de Havilland as Germaine
 Edward Everett Horton as Tubby
 Melville Cooper as M. Picard
 Lionel Atwill as Beaumarchais
 Luis Alberni as Basset
 Lana Turner as Auber
 Marie Wilson as Nicolle
 Linda Perry as Molee
 Fritz Leiber Sr. as Horatio
 Etienne Girardot as Jean Cabot
 Dorothy Tree as Mme. Moreau
 Craig Reynolds as M. Janin
 Paul Everton as Innkeeper of Adam and Eve
Trevor Bardette as M. Noverre
 Milton Owen as Thierre
 Albert Dekker as LeBrun
 Chester Clute as M. Moreau

Uncredited actors include Harry Davenport as the Innkeeper of Turk's Head and Fritz Leiber Jr., later well known as an author, as Fortinbras in the Hamlet play.

Production
The film was made by James Whale for Warner Brothers shortly after the troubled production of The Road Back which had met with controversy and opposition from the Nazi government, and strained his relationship with his bosses at Universal Pictures where he had worked for the past six years. The Garrick film was intended to be a more light-hearted effort. However, both it and his next film Port of Seven Seas were failures at the box office. Whale eventually returned to Universal where he saw out his contract largely by making B Movies.

Reception
The New York Times critic Frank Nugent praised the film and Aherne's performance:
Of the many legends about David Garrick, that almost legendary figure of the 18th-century theater, count as one of the most amusing The Great Garrick ... Brian Aherne (presents) Garrick as the young and handsome swashbuckler we rather hoped to find. ... (The film) is an agile and picturesque farce within a farce... most amusingly presented and humorously resolved.

Variety called it:
... a production of superlative workmanship fabricated from old prints of the period, and acting by a fine cast in the flamboyant manner demanded by the script...not without some very amusing angles. Fact is, it is a farce, should be played as a farce with speed and increasing hilarity. Such, however, is not the case. Whale's direction is geared to a slow tempo. His romantic passages between Aherne and De Havilland are quite charming, but much too long.

In 1998, Jonathan Rosenbaum of the Chicago Reader included the film in his unranked list of the best American films not included on the AFI Top 100.

In 2006, Dennis Schwartz wrote that this "neglected period farce deserves more attention and love; it's one of Whale's most joyous films and shows he can make great comedies outside of the horror genre... It's a thoroughly enjoyable romantic comedy, with the ensemble cast in fine form and under Whale's able direction it catches all the fun in the farce."

References

Sources

External links

 
 
 
 

1937 films
1930s historical comedy films
1937 romantic comedy films
American historical comedy films
American black-and-white films
Films about actors
American films based on plays
Films set in the 1750s
Films set in London
Films set in Paris
Warner Bros. films
Films directed by James Whale
Films scored by Adolph Deutsch
David Garrick
American historical romance films
1930s historical romance films
1930s English-language films
1930s American films